Del Monte Land Transport Bus Company  (DLTBCo) is a provincial bus company formed as a subsidiary of Del Monte Motor Works, Incorporated. It was formed as a resurgent of Batangas Laguna Tayabas Bus Company Incorporated (BLTBCo.), one of the oldest provincial bus companies in the Philippines. It plies routes mainly to Southern Luzon provinces and other parts in Eastern Visayas region.

DLTBCo. was founded in 2010 when BLTBCo. was taken over by DMMW and later added to its investment, although one must take note that DLTBCo. and BLTBCo. are different companies from each other, but their similarity is its routes that the latter have. It was because the former has announced its restoration of the old routes made by the latter after the firm's take over. BLTBCo., on the other hand, was founded in 1918 shortly before the end of World War I. Thus, DLTBCo is one of the nation's oldest bus firms if the BTLBCo history and timeline are included.

Etymology
The company was derived from the union of two small bus companies—BTCo. and LTB. BTCo. stands for Batangas Transportation Company, while LTB stands for Laguna Tayabas Bus Company. The union was made by Max Blouse, an American seargeant who fought in the Spanish–American War in 1898. After the war, he decided to stay in the Philippines.

History
 Before proceeding to its present history, it is important to know about the historical background of BLTBCo., so that we may be able to see the difference between the past and the present history (DLTBCo.)

1918

It was in 1918 when Max Blouse began his business ventures and he founded the Batangas Transportation Company (BTCo). Starting with only one "calesa-like tires with wooden spokes" bus, Max Blouse performed a wondrous task of being the driver, conductor and repairman for the whole operation. Through his handwork and dedication, he eventually acquired 17 more units of the passenger vehicles painted in red that people fondly called "pula" - the basis of today's DLTBCo bus livery.

1928

As a result of the thriving operation in the transportation business, Max Blouse in 1928 incorporated BTCo with his newly established bus company dubbed as Laguna Tayabas Bus Company (LTB), concentrating in the area of Laguna and Tayabas. The two enterprises he had installed apportioned a conspicuous achievement until the disruption of the Second World War.

The remnants of the war resulted to an intense damage and decline of the company's business activities. All operations were closed, records were destroyed and most of the company-owned buildings were ravaged by the war. In spite of the miscarriage during those times, Max Blouse never lost his forbearance and intensified his effort to raise back the company's destroyed properties.

1945

Under a "Joint Emergency Operations" agreement on May 22, 1945, the two corporations proceeded its operation with 28 Chevrolet buses which Max Blouse acquired from the US army. Again, through his diligence and high-spirited deeds, he enabled a spectacular stride by bringing back the prosperity that the company savored prior to the war. The pressing demand for public transportation also moved him to respond immediately by providing the people's need to commute from one place to another as the country suffered from the debris of the war.

1961–1964

The death of Max Blouse on December 28, 1961 posted a challenge to Col. Pelagio G. Potenciano, a doctor by profession, who took the place of his father-in-law's designation as president. Albeit the fact the Colonel Potenciano did not have enough skills on the transportation business, he was bale to manage the two corporations well through his dedication and industry. It was during his administration where the BTCo and LTB finally merged into one company and was approved by the company's stockholder in 1964, thus, creating a new name termed as the Batangas Laguna Tayabas Bus Company (BLTBCo).

1977–1988

Colonel Potenciano's son Max, nicknamed "Sonny", became the president from 1977 up to 1988. Just like his grandfather and that of his dad, strong determination, and the will to succeed had inspired him to propel all the accomplishments into the limelight. With the full support of his loving wife Dolly Alonso and four sons namely Joey, Binky, Mike and Snooky the company realized its targets and was able to cope with the stiff competition in the transportation business.

In 1988, a new formula was instilled into the company's management milieu by a new woman president in the person of Dolores Alonso Potenciano, wife of Max B. Potenciano. When she took her position as president, re-structuring was adopted by modifying BLTBCo. into a multi-million enterprise having an all-Filipino management. (The company was originally in partnership by Max Blouse and his American associates).

During the course of her supervision as president, Mrs. Potenciano adapted a lot of changes and development in the whole operation. Her good dispositions and adeptness in yielding ingenious ideas propped up growth and changes in the entire company.

1997–2003

BLTBCo was under the management of its new chairman and chief executive officer Benjamin M. Bitanga, a business associate of the company. Taking over as president less than a year before, under Bitanga the company continued servicing the people from the southern part of Luzon and areas within the provinces of Samar and Leyte.

However, in 2001, Potenciano family had their political ambitions in Laguna. With them spending much on it. They lost the elections. The company's problem continued with series of lawsuits from their employees due to unfair labor practice and violation of the collective bargaining agreement (CBA). It was also the time when Bitanga and Potenciano clans had disputes over the management of the company.

In 2003, a fire erupted at Malibay that reached over their bus terminal. The fire destroyed many of their bus fleets including their repair garage. The company discontinues business for six years.

2009–present

In 2009, after the suspended operations and renovation for six years, Del Monte Motor Works (DMMW), a bus and truck manufacturer based in Quezon City took over the management of BLTBCo. They rename the company as Del Monte Land Transport Bus Company (DLTBCo), and continues routes to Metro Manila via Laguna, Quezon Province, Batangas Province, Camarines Sur, Camarines Norte & Albay.

In 2010, DLTBCo resumes its trip to Eastern Visayas, primarily at Northern Samar, Western Samar, Leyte and Southern Leyte.

With the help of the new management, they provided new bus units for the company and offers new services such as free Wi-Fi and their "Greyhound Express Service".

Issues and criticisms
The issue on labor union in BLTBCo has caused up to pay for its damages filed by their employees. In 1973, during the Martial Law, a group of private respondents, totaling 34 employees, led by bus conductors Librado Aquino and Eufemio Bondad, demanded the company for backwages and separation pay. These employees were detained by the military due to alleged involvement in the defraudation of the fund of the company. The management also refused to give them back pay. In the decision by the National Labor Relations Commission (NLRC), favoring the decision to the complainants, the management forced to give separation pay to the employees.

Consecutive strikes led by labor union leaders of the company were able to file cases against the management due to unfair labor practice and violation of the collective bargaining agreement (CBA). BLTBCo management forced to pay those employees who led the strike in two consecutive years.

The bankruptcy of BLTBCo was caused by the involvement of one member of Potenciano family to run for governor in Laguna, but failed to win in the 2001 local elections. This time, the labor union filed a class suit against the management. By then, BLTBCo has again, a troubled history when the Potenciano clan strongly refused to give up the bus company to its investors. As a result, the company was totally crippled by financial losses and mismanagement for six years. The Bitanga and Potenciano clans have disputes on the management of the company.

Fleet

BLTBCo has maintained MAN, Hino, UD Nissan Diesel, Mercedes-Benz, Isuzu, and Mitsubishi Fuso units from the time of re-fleeting between 1988 and 2001. Unfortunately, all of its buses were already defunct, while others were turned into ashes by the tragic 2003 fire along Malibay.

When Del Monte Motor Works, Inc. took over the management, their coachbuilding division provides additional bus units. With those units manufactured by Del Monte such as the DM10, DM11, DM12, and DM14s, the company has maintained most of the old routes and presently they have Ashok Leyland, Hino, Hyundai, MAN, Kia, Kinglong & Yutong units. DMMW is dedicated to gerund the old history of the company to be able to reach its 100th foundation anniversary.

Here are their fleets as of March 2020:

CBU/Complete Buses
 Hyundai Universe Space Luxury (100 series)
 Ashok Leyland Viking BS3 (600 series)
 King Long XMQ6117Y (700 series)
 King Long XMQ6101Y (2nd batch, 700 series)
 King Long XMQ6129Y2 (800 series, Greyhound units)
 Yutong ZK6107HA (1200 series)
 Yutong ZK6122HD9 (1400 series)
 Ankai A6 HFF6119KDE5B (1500 series)
 Ankai A8 HFF6121K09D1E51 (1600 series)

Coaches locally built by Del Monte Motor Works, Inc
 DMMC DM10 body (ongoing rebodied into DM16 S2)
- Hino RK1J-ST bus chassis 
- Hino RK1J-MT bus chassis (500 series) 
-  Hyundai Aero Space LS bus chassis (200 series)
 DMMC DM11 body (ongoing rebodied into DM16 S2)
- Hino RK1J-ST bus chassis
- Hino RK1J-MT bus chassis
- Hyundai Aero Space LS bus chassis (200 series; 900 series for Ordinary fleets)
 DMMC DM12 Series 1 body 
- Hino RK1J-ST bus chassis
- Hino RM2P-SS bus chassis
- Hyundai Aero Space LS bus chassis
- MAN R39 18.350 HOCL (1100 series, some rebodied to DM18 Series 1)
 DMMC DM12 Series 2 body
- Hyundai Aero Space LS bus chassis
 DMMC DM14 Series 1 body 
- MAN R39 18.350 HOCL
 DMMC DM14 Series 2 body (for 2100 and 5100 series)
- Hino RK1J-ST bus chassis
- Hyundai Aero Space LS bus chassis
 DMMC DM16 Series 2 body 
- Hino RK1J-ST bus chassis (rebodied fleet)  
- Hino RM2P-SS bus chassis (rebodied fleet) 
- Hyundai Aero Space LS bus chassis (rebodied fleet) 
- Volvo B8R (1700 series)
 DMMC DM18 Series 1 body
- MAN R39 18.350 HOCL (rebodied fleet)

Past:
- Hyundai Aero Space LS (300 series, Korean Surplus, 2010-2015) 
- Kia Granbird (400 series, Korean Surplus, 2010-2015)

Terminals
Taft Avenue, Pasay
EDSA, Pasay
EDSA Cubao, Quezon City 
Araneta City Bus Port, Cubao, Quezon City
EDSA Timog, Quezon City
Pedro Guevarra Avenue, Santa Cruz, Laguna
Santa Rosa Integrated Terminal, Santa Rosa, Laguna in front of SM City Santa Rosa
Calaca-Lemery Highway, Lemery, Batangas
J.P. Laurel Highway, SM City Lipa Grand Terminal, Lipa, Batangas
J.P. Laurel Street, Nasugbu, Batangas
Talipan, Pagbilao, Quezon
Maharlika Highway, Daet, Camarines Norte
Legazpi City Grand Terminal, Legazpi Port District, Legazpi, Albay
Parañaque Integrated Terminal Exchange, Parañaque
Luisiana Park, Luisiana, Laguna
Lucban Plaza, Lucban, Quezon
Sampaloc Street, Sampaloc, Quezon

Routes
 Taft - Batangas City / Lobo, Batangas / Luisiana, Laguna / Santa Cruz, Laguna / Santa Maria, Laguna / Lemery / Lipa / Nasugbu / Lucena / Balayan / Calatagan via South Luzon Expressway or Coastal Road
 PITX - Balayan / Calatagan / Nasugbu via Manila-Cavite Expressway / Aguinaldo Highway and Santa Cruz, Laguna
 Araneta / EDSA Pasay / PITX - Daet / Naga /  Legazpi / Gubat / Bulan
 Cubao - Santa Cruz, Laguna / Lemery / Batangas City / Lobo, Batangas / Lipa / Lucena / Daet
 Araneta - Lagonoy / Palompon / Maasin / Ormoc

Destinations

Metro Manila 
 EDSA, Pasay** 
 Taft Avenue, Pasay 
 EDSA Cubao, Quezon City 
 Araneta City Bus Port, Cubao, Quezon City** 
 Alabang, Muntinlupa
Parañaque Integrated Terminal Exchange, Parañaque****

Provincial Destinations 
 Luzon
 Balayan, Batangas*
 Batangas City*
 Calatagan, Batangas*
 Lemery, Batangas* 
 Lian, Batangas 
 Lipa, Batangas*** 
 Lobo, Batangas***
 Nasugbu, Batangas*
 Tuy, Batangas* 
 Tagaytay City, Cavite
 Turbina, Calamba, Laguna
 Luisiana, Laguna
 Santa Rosa, Laguna (Santa Rosa Integrated Terminal)
 San Pablo, Laguna
 Santa Cruz, Laguna*
 Santa Maria, Laguna*
 Lucena City, Quezon*
 Pagbilao, Quezon 
 Capalonga, Camarines Norte
 Daet, Camarines Norte* 
 Buhi, Camarines Sur* 
 Lagonoy, Camarines Sur*
 Naga City, Camarines Sur*
 Iriga City, Camarines Sur*
 Daraga, Albay
 Legazpi City, Albay* 
 Tabaco City, Albay*
 Sorsogon City, Sorsogon
 Bulan, Sorsogon*
 Gubat, Sorsogon*
 Irosin, Sorsogon*
 Matnog, Sorsogon
Eastern Visayas
 Allen, Northern Samar
 Catarman, Northern Samar
 Catubig, Northern Samar
 Calbayog
 Catbalogan, Samar
 Tacloban City, Leyte
 Baybay, Leyte
 Palompon, Leyte
 Ormoc City, Leyte*
 Liloan, Southern Leyte
 Maasin City, Southern Leyte* 
 Silago, Southern Leyte
Naval, Biliran

* denotes that DLTBCo. has restored most of its old routes same as that of BLTBCo
** denotes that available only Bicol & Visayas trips.
*** denotes the present routes of DLTBCo. which are not part of BLTBCo. or somehow
**** denotes that the trips here are for trips via Aguinaldo Highway

References

Bus companies of the Philippines
Companies based in Pasay